WBRK (1340 AM) is a radio station licensed to serve Pittsfield, Massachusetts.  The radio station is owned by WBRK, Inc. It airs a classic hits radio format. The station was assigned the WBRK call letters by the Federal Communications Commission.

WBRK is powered at 1,000 watts non-directional.  Programming is also heard on FM translator W246DM at 97.1 MHz.

History
It used radio studios located on "Bank Row" in downtown Pittsfield. As with many stations of that era, the spacious studios allowed for live performances by the big bands and orchestras of the day. It was also a CBS Radio Network affiliate, airing its dramas, comedies, news, sports, soap operas, game shows and big band broadcasts during the "Golden Age of Radio."

On February 5, 1954, the company founded the only commercial television station to call the Berkshires home, with WMGT Channel 19. The television station, with a tower on Mount Greylock, was later sold and eventually evolved into WCDC-TV, a satellite station of WTEN in Albany, New York.  It was shut down in 2017.

WBRK had a middle of the road format for much of the 1950s, 60s, 70s and 80s.  It transitioned to talk radio in the 1990s formerly carried New York Yankees games, as well as local sports broadcasts. It also airs some CBS Sports Radio programming, including Jim Rome and Doug Gottlieb.

From 1941 to 1960 Mr. Dan Healy worked as a sports broadcaster for WBRK.

References

External links

BRK
Classic hits radio stations in the United States
Mass media in Berkshire County, Massachusetts
Pittsfield, Massachusetts
Radio stations established in 1938